Rhytiphora rosei is a species of beetle in the family Cerambycidae. It was described by Olliff in 1890. It is known from Australia.

References

rosei
Beetles described in 1890